Wahlsburg was a municipality in the district of Kassel, in Hesse, Germany. On January 1, 2020, Wahlsburg merged with neighboring Oberweser to form the municipality of Wesertal.

References

Kassel (district)
Former municipalities in Hesse